Randy Boldyga is an American technology entrepreneur and business executive, and the CEO and founder of RXNT, a private healthcare software technology company headquartered in Maryland. Boldyga founded RXNT in 1999, originally named Networking Technology, Inc.

Early life and education 
Boldyga grew up in Anne Arundel County, Maryland. His father, William, was an engineer at Northrop Grumman and his mother, Janet, was a Human Resource Director for Queen Anne's County, Maryland. Boldyga graduated from Annapolis High School in Annapolis, Maryland. He received a Bachelor of Science degree in mathematics from the College of Natural and Mathematical Sciences at the University of Maryland, Baltimore County in 1988.

Career

Early career 
After graduating, Boldyga worked as a contractor for the U.S. federal government's Department of Defense (DoD), the Department of Energy (DOE), the Federal Bureau of Investigation (FBI), and the United States Office of the Independent Counsel.

Boldyga served as Director of Network Support for the Clinical Health Information Systems Department at the University of Arkansas for Medical Sciences (UAMS) in Little Rock, Arkansas. He joined The Columbia Bank in 1998, serving as the Vice President of Information Systems.

RXNT 
Boldyga founded RXNT (as Networking Technology Inc.) on May 27, 1999, originally operating from the basement of his Annapolis home. In 2003, the company received $150,000 in funding to start and expand the business in the form of a Small Business Administration loan from the Anne Arundel County Economic Development Corporation's “Arundel Business Loan Fund”, but has not sought venture capital funding and remains privately held. Boldyga currently serves as the Founder, President, and CEO of the company.

In October 2007, Boldyga filed for a software patent surrounding a database management system for electronic prescribing; an “interactive prescription processing and managing system.” The patent application was published in 2009.

Personal life 
Boldyga lives in Amelia Island, Florida, and in Kent Island on the Eastern Shore of Maryland. He and his wife, Claudia, are the Founding Chairs of the Luminis Health Anne Arundel Medical Center (AAMC) Foundation's Denim and Diamonds events. He held a seat on the Anne Arundel Economic Development Corporation's Board of Directors from 2014 to 2016. Boldyga and Claudia have two sons, Zach and Nate.

In 2015, Boldyga donated $100,000 to the Severn School in Severna Park, Maryland for the Teel Academic Innovation Center's campaign for “students and staff to collaborate, create and connect in new ways of design, thinking and building.”

In 2020, during the COVID-19 pandemic, Boldyga donated laptop computers to Grasonville Elementary School to help students gain access to coursework and continue learning at home during school closures.

References

Year of birth missing (living people)
Living people
Businesspeople from Maryland
People from Maryland
University of Maryland, Baltimore County alumni
American chief executives
American health care chief executives
American technology chief executives
Businesspeople in information technology